The Emblem of Israel depicts a temple menorah surrounded by an olive branch on each side, with the word Israel written in Hebrew below it. While it is commonly displayed in blue and white, the emblem has appeared in alternative colour combinations depending on the use, such as on the Israeli Presidential Standard (see below).

History

The State of Israel adopted the symbol after a design competition held in 1948. The design is based on the winning entry submitted by Gabriel and Maxim Shamir's proposal, with elements taken from other submissions, including entries from Oteh Walisch, W. Struski, Itamar David, Yerachmiel Schechter, and Willie Wind, whose entry won the first design competition. The emblem was officially adopted on February 10, 1949.

Symbolism
The image used on the emblem is based on a depiction of the menorah on the Arch of Titus. The menorah was used in the ancient Temple in Jerusalem and has been a symbol of Judaism since ancient times. It symbolizes universal enlightenment, based on what is written in Isaiah 60: "Nations will come to your light, and kings to the brightness of your dawn".

The emblem may also be based on the vision of the biblical prophet Zechariah, chapter 4, where he describes seeing a menorah flanked by two olive trees, one on each side.

Usage
The following gallery shows various contexts in which the emblem is used:

See also

National symbols of Israel
Arch of Titus
Menorah (Temple)

References

External links
State of Israel Emblem page in Shamir Brothers works collection web-site - Designers of the emblem in 1949

Israel
 
Israel
Israel
National symbols of Israel
Israel